Pioneer Valley (Bosnian, Croatian and Serbian: Pionirska dolina / Пионирска долина) is a recreational and entertainment center and zoo located in Koševo neighborhood, Sarajevo, Bosnia and Herzegovina.

History
Recreation and entertainment center "Pioneer Valley" and the zoo is the oldest zoo in Bosnia and Herzegovina. During the Austro-Hungarian period it was located in Ilidža, but later it was relocated to the northeastern part of Sarajevo, just 2 kilometers away from downtown, in the municipality of Centar.

Zoo
In Pionirska dolina zoo there are 59 species of animals from all over the world.

In February 2013, it was announced that Sofia Zoo would donate two lions to Pionirska dolina zoo. After they were donated in March 2013, a lioness died after several days. Cause of the death was infection with E. coli.

World of dinosaurs
During the period between 25 January and 19 February 2012, Pionirska dolina hosted an exhibition with 52 dinosaurs, reconstructed by a German Palaeontological Research Center, under the strict supervision of the Paleontology museum in Hanover.

Gallery

References

External links

Centar, Sarajevo
Zoos in Bosnia and Herzegovina
Buildings and structures in Sarajevo